Embassy of the Blessed Kingdom of God for All Nations (also known as Embassy of God) is an Evangelical Christian Charismatic megachurch, denomination, and parachurch organization headquartered in Kyiv, Ukraine. The senior pastor is Sunday Adelaja.

History
In 1993, the church began with Pastor Sunday Adelaja and 7 people in an apartment.

The church was officially founded in 1994 as the "World of Faith Bible Church". In 2002, the church changed her name to "Embassy of the Blessed Kingdom of God for All Nations".

In 2008, the church opened 20 churches in Ukraine and 18 in the world.

In 2013, the church claimed 25,000 members in Kyiv, 100,000 members in Ukraine, 1,000 churches in the World.

Social programs

Thousands of people are fed daily through soup kitchens in Kyiv. The church also has a program for helping homeless people acquiring skills, thus helping them back to a normal life and work. According to the church, 2,000 children have been helped off the street, and have been returned to their families. Furthermore, the church runs a 24-hour hot-line, named "Trust line", for people to call in need. The church also works with addicted people and has a program helping addicted people to be set free from various addictions. The main organization is called "Love Rehabilitation Center". According to the church, more than 5000 drug and alcohol addicted people have been set free from their addiction through their work.

Schools
There are many educational institutions connected to the church, and among them the following are more known: the Joshua Missionary Bible Institute in Ukraine, the Center of Restoration of Personality and Transformation of the Society in Ukraine, the History Makers Bible School in the US, the UK, Germany, France, and the Institute for National Transformation in Nigeria.

Criticism
The church faces opposition from the Eastern Orthodox and Catholic churches, other Ukrainian Evangelicals, authorities, and political groups. The church receives significant criticism for teaching the doctrine of prosperity. The church's reputation also suffered after members were implicated in a financial fraud case: King's Capital, a financial group led by a former member of his congregation, promised as much as 60 percent returns on investments and drew many of its investors from the church. Later, several former church members went to the authorities claiming they were unable to recover the money they invested, which left many of them bankrupt. Police later arrested Aleksandr Bandurchenko, a church member and one of King Capital's leaders, on suspicion of fraud.

See also
Pentecostalism in Ukraine
List of the largest evangelical churches
List of the largest evangelical church auditoriums
Worship service (evangelicalism)

References

External links
 Official website
 BBC article
 Adelaja Watch, website critical about Sunday Adelaja, run by the Centers for Apologetics Research.

Charismatic churches in Ukraine
Evangelicalism in Europe
Charismatic denominations
Pentecostalism in Ukraine
Evangelical megachurches in Ukraine